Kakki Nau  (literally Lion Territory) is a village 7 km southwest of Shorkot Tehsil, Jhang district, Punjab, Pakistan. It is named for a traditional tale that a dangerous lion was killed nearby.

The village has a boys' government school and a high school for girls. Basic medical care is available. Many villagers own small businesses, shops, or work for the government.

The town is conservative socially; men wear traditional clothes, such as the shalwar kameez, as well as turbans and dhotis. Kakki Nau hosts a religious festival, Mella Jattipeer, each summer; traditional games and entertainment are part of the festivities.

The greatest number of residents are of the Khokhar  caste,Joiya caste, Rajput caste, of the Rana and Kathia sub-castes. The population is mostly Muslim, both Shi'a and Sunni, with an Ahmadi minority. The major languages are Punjabi (everyday usage) and Urdu (in education).

The weather is hot in summer and cold and dry in winter.

Jhang District